The 1897 Swarthmore Quakers football team was an American football team that represented Swarthmore College as an independent during the 1897 college football season. The team compiled a 7–3–2 record and outscored opponents by a total of 114 to 60. Jacob K. Shell was the head coach.

Schedule

References

Swarthmore
Swarthmore Garnet Tide football seasons
Swarthmore Quakers football